The Golden Mountains are a mountain range in the Sudetes on the border between Poland and the Czech Republic. Various ores were mined here from the 13th to the 20th century, including gold, hence the name Golden Mountains. There is a gold mine open to the public in Złoty Stok. It is the wildest, least civilized and least visited mountain range in Poland.

See also 
 Bielice, Lower Silesian Voivodeship
 Crown of Polish Mountains

Sudetes
Geography of the Olomouc Region
Landforms of Lower Silesian Voivodeship
Mountain ranges of Poland
Mountain ranges of the Czech Republic